Anselm of Liège (1008 – c. 1056) was a chronicler of the eleventh century of the Prince-Bishopric of Liège.

Biography
He was educated at the episcopal school of Liège, and became canon and dean of the cathedral, where he enjoyed the friendship of the bishop of Liège, Wazo. His chronicle, regarded as one of the best of the period, both for literary merit and for historical value, is known as the Gesta Episcoporum Tungrensium, Trajectensium, et Leodiensium, and is a continuation of the earlier work by Heriger of Lobbes (d. 1007) that dealt with the first twenty-seven bishops, from St. Maternus (90) to Remaclus (680). Anselm's work, written at the request of his godmother, the countess Ida, Abbess of St. Cecilia, Cologne, added the lives of twenty-five more bishops, down to Wazo, of whom he gave a very full and particular account.

The "Gesta" is to be found in the Monumenta Germaniæ Historica (Scriptores, VII, 161-234; also Scriptores, XIV, 107-120 (1883)). Anselm's style is clear, and his zeal for church reform is equalled by his critical intelligence.

References

1008 births
1050s deaths
11th-century historians from the Holy Roman Empire
Writers from Liège
People of the Prince-Bishopric of Liège